KXKC (99.1 FM) is a radio station licensed for New Iberia, Louisiana in the Lafayette, Louisiana metropolitan area. It airs a classic country music format, and is under ownership of Cumulus Media.  Its studios are located on Galbert Road in Lafayette, and its transmitter is located north of St. Martinville, Louisiana.

History

Don Bonin first signed on on the 99.1 frequency in January 1969 as the FM counterpart of KNIR with the calls KNIR-FM. KNIR-FM eventually became KDEA-FM in the early 1970s, playing beautiful music-easy listening for the Lafayette and Baton Rouge radio markets. The format continued through the 1980s and into the early 1990s, when the popularity of the easy listening format began to decline nationwide and KDEA went into competition with KTDY with a mainstream adult contemporary format.

On August 21, 1992, at 6 pm KDEA started playing the song "American Pie" by Don McLean on a continuous loop. Between each playing of the song, a voice could be heard saying, "A new day begins Monday." The song continued to play over and over until 6 am Monday, August 24, when a jingle played announcing that the station was now "Hot Country 99.1, KXKC". This was followed by "Friends in Low Places", by Garth Brooks, and KXKC was born. It has lasted for 21 years.

The station had normal operations for only one day as Hurricane Andrew was approaching. On Tuesday, August 25 at 10 am, the station began continuous coverage of the ever-closer hurricane.  The storm came ashore early Wednesday morning, knocking the station off the air for 20 hours when water shorted out the transmitter in Parks, Louisiana.  Hurricane recovery information dominated the station for the next few days, but by the following Monday morning, August 31, 1992, KXKC was operating as normal.

The original lineup was:
The KXKC Coffee Club with Scott Daniels (now with Townsquare Media - Lafayette), and Renée’ Revett (now with Big 102.1 in Crowley)
Kelly Thompson middays (now in radio sales in Mississippi)
Jerry Methvin afternoons (retired)
Randi Clark nights (deceased)
Joel the Overnight Guy (whereabouts unknown)

  Citadel merged with Cumulus Media on September 16, 2011.

On September 4, 2020, KXKC dropped Nash FM and rebranded back as "99.1 KXKC."

On September 2, 2022, KXKC shifted their format to 90s-based classic country.

Possibly in the future, KXKC may add a bunch more pre-90s country stuff to really bring back a full time classic country station especially to Baton Rouge when they haven’t had one since KYPY flipped to sports in 2013.

Previous logos

References

External links

Classic country radio stations in the United States
Cumulus Media radio stations
Radio stations in Louisiana
Radio stations established in 1969
1969 establishments in Louisiana